The 1958 California gubernatorial election was held on Tuesday November 4, Democratic candidate Pat Brown won the first of his two terms as governor of California against Republican senator William Knowland.

General election results
California was considered a Republican stronghold in the post-World War II era, electing Republican governors Earl Warren and Goodwin Knight, as well as senators Richard Nixon, Knowland, and Thomas Kuchel. Knowland was a prestigious two-term Senator who had served as Senate Majority Leader and Senate Minority Leader. His seat was considered safe going into the 1958 midterm elections, but he stunned everyone when he announced his intention to run for governor instead of re-election to the Senate. This was especially surprising because California had a relatively popular Republican governor in Goodwin Knight who was also expected to be re-elected. Knowland coerced Knight into a "backroom deal" in which Knowland and Knight would "trade places", with Knight running for Knowland's Senate seat.  Knight really had no desire to be Senator and in later years lamented how Knowland "strongarmed" him into the switch. Knowland thought being governor would enhance his chances of challenging another Californian, Richard Nixon, for the 1960 Republican presidential nomination.  For their part, the Democrats nominated popular state Attorney General Edmund G. "Pat" Brown, who was the only Democrat that held a statewide office in a Republican leaning state. As it turned out, the Knowland-Knight switch was not popular with California voters. Brown steadily gained in the polls and defeated Knowland for governor, and Knight lost to Congressman Clair Engle in the Senate race.

Results by county
Brown is the last Democratic gubernatorial nominee to have won Glenn, Inyo, Sutter, and Tulare Counties. The Democratic gubernatorial candidate would not win Butte and Riverside Counties again until 1978.

See also
Elections in California

References

California Elections Page

Further reading 
 Anderson, Totton J. “The 1958 Election in California.” Western Political Quarterly 12#1 (1959), pp. 276–300. online
 Anderson, Totton J. "Extremism in California Politics: The Brown-Knowland and Brown-Nixon Campaigns Compared." Political Research Quarterly 16.2 (1963): 371+.
 Bell, Jonathan. "Social Democracy and the Rise of the Democratic Party in California, 1950–1964." Historical Journal 49.2 (2006): 497-524. online
 Pawel, Miriam. (2018). The Browns of California : the family dynasty that transformed a state and shaped a nation. New York: Bloomsbury Publishing.
 Rapoport, R. California Dreaming: The Political Odyssey of Pat & Jerry Brown. Berkeley: Nolo Press (1982) .
  summary
 Rarick, Ethan. "The Brown Dynasty." in Modern American Political Dynasties: A Study of Power, Family, and Political Influence ed by Kathleen Gronnerud and Scott J. Spitzer. (2018): 211-30.
 Rice, Richard B. (2012). The Elusive Eden: A New History of California. New York: McGraw-Hill. .
 Rogin, Michael Paul, John L. Shover. Political Change in California: Critical Elections and Social Movements, 1890-1966 (Greenwood, 1970).
 Schuparra, Kurt. Triumph of the Right: The Rise of the California Conservative Movement, 1945-1966 (M.E. Sharpe, 1998).

Gubernatorial
California
1958
November 1958 events in the United States